Yaman may refer to:

Yaman (name), people with the given name or surname
Yaman (raga), a raga in Hindustani classical music
Yaman (film), a 2017 Indian film
Yaman (tribal group), an Arab tribal confederation

Places
Yaman, Iran, a village in Iran
Yaman, Mudanya, Turkey
Yaman, variant transliteration of Yemen

See also
"Dle Yaman", a traditional Armenian song rearranged by Komitas
Yattaman, a television show
Yemen (disambiguation)